Bartosz Kaśnikowski (born 31 July 1989 in Białystok) is a Polish footballer who currently plays for Chojniczanka Chojnice.

Career

Kaśnikowski made his Ekstraklasa debut on 27 September 2009.

In September 2010, he joined Sokół Sokółka.

In January 2011, he moved to Chojniczanka Chojnice on a one-and-a-half-year contract.

References

External links
 

1989 births
Polish footballers
Legia Warsaw II players
Jagiellonia Białystok players
Śląsk Wrocław players
Living people
Sportspeople from Białystok
Association football defenders